Peddiea is a genus of plant in the family Thymelaeaceae.

Species
Species include (but this list is incomplete):
 Peddiea kivuensis, Robyns

References

Taxonomy articles created by Polbot
Thymelaeoideae
Malvales genera